Bellman may refer to:
 Town crier, an officer of the court who makes public pronouncements
 Bellhop, a hotel porter
 Bellman (surname)
 Bellman (diving), a standby diver and diver's attendant
 Bellman hangar, a prefabricated, portable aircraft hangar
 Bellman's Head, a headland point in Stonehaven Bay, Scotland

Arts 
 The Bellman (film), a 1945 French drama film
 The Bellman (character), a character in the Thursday Next novels
 "Bellman", a character in Lewis Carroll's poem The Hunting of the Snark
 Bellman Prize, a literature prize awarded by the Swedish Academy
 Bellman joke, a type of Swedish joke
 Zvončari, a Croatian folk custom

Sciences 
Bellman equation, a condition for optimality in dynamic programming
Hamilton–Jacobi–Bellman equation, a condition for optimality of a control with respect to a loss function
Bellman–Ford algorithm, a method for finding shortest paths

See also 
Belman (disambiguation)